The 5th Anti-Tank Regiment, Royal New Zealand Artillery was a territorial artillery regiment of the New Zealand Army. It was formed in 1948 and was equipped with 17-pounder anti-tank guns. In 1949 it was decided to convert the regiment to self-propelled 25-pounders and to add a troop of 4.2 inch mortars, similar to the organisation of 7th Anti-Tank regiment during the latter phases of WWII. The conversion, however, was never completed and the regiment was disbanded in 1950. A 4.2 inch mortar battery was subsequently formed and would go on to become 5th Light Regiment.

References

Artillery regiments of New Zealand
Military units and formations established in 1948
Military units and formations established in 1950